Nicolas Prosper Bauyn, seigneur d’Angervilliers (15 January 1675 – 15 February 1740) was a French politician. He served as intendant de Dauphiné, intendant d'Alsace, and finally as Secretary of State for War from July 1728 until his death.

Life
The son of a fermier général, Prosper Bauyn d'Angervilliers was intendant of the généralité of Alençon (1702–1705), then intendant of Dauphiné (1705–1716), of Alsace (1716–1724) and finally of Paris (1724–1728). An experienced administrator, the cardinal de Fleury made him secretary of state for war on the death of Claude le Blanc. In that post, he reorganised the gendarmerie and carried out preparations for the War of the Polish Succession. In order not to be reliant on imports, Louis XV had Angervilliers put in charge of setting up a white-metal factory to equip the army with swords and bayonets - this was set up in Klingenthal (Alsace) in 1730.

1675 births
1740 deaths
Secretaries of State for War (France)